Szabolcs Vida is a former Hungarian motorcycle speedway rider who was a member of Hungary's national team.

Career details 
 Team World Championship (Speedway World Team Cup and Speedway World Cup)
 2003 - 11th place
 2004 - 8th place
 Individual Hungarian Championship
 2000 - 15th place (1 pt)
 2001 - 15th place (5 pts)
 2002 - 12th place (15 pts)
 2003 - 10th place (21 pts)
 2004 - 26th place (4 pts)

See also 
 Hungary national speedway team

References 

Living people
Hungarian speedway riders

Year of birth missing (living people)